Associação Beneficente e Esportiva Catalana e Ouvidorense is a football club in the city of Ouvidor, in the state of Goiás the club is affiliated to Federação Goiana de Futebol.

History
Founded in 2007, in the city of Catalão, with the social character of moral and educational training of children and adolescents through the learning of sport, it moves to the city of Ouvidor, where on June 22, 2016 it created the department of football.

The club joined the Federação Goiana de Futebol in 2016 and already in 2017 disputed the Campeonato Goiano (Third Division). With good performances from the team, which had veteran Nonato as a striker, the Abecat team ended the competition by becoming the runner-up of the first professional competition they had ever competed in.

With the runner-up of  Campeonato Goiano (Third Division) em 2017, the team won the right to compete in the second division of Campeonato Goiano (Second Division) 2018, but Abecat ended up giving up and gave up the spot for the Jataiense team.

Titles
 Campeonato Goiano (Third Division) Runner-up (2017)

References 

Association football clubs established in 2016
Football clubs in Goiás